Doubtless Bay is a bay on the east coast of the Northland Region, north-east of Kaitaia, in New Zealand. It extends from Knuckle Point on Karikari Peninsula in the north to Berghan Point at Hihi in the south. There are rocky headlands, backed by many extensive beaches, such as Tokerau Beach, Taipa, Cable Bay, Coopers Beach, and Mangonui Harbour.

Māori discovery
Kupe, the Māori discoverer of New Zealand, is said to have made his initial landfall at Taipa, in Doubtless Bay.

European contact
Doubtless Bay was named by Captain James Cook during his first voyage of Pacific exploration in 1769. When Cook sailed past the entrance to the area, he recorded in his journal "doubtless a bay", hence the name. Poor weather prevented Cook from entering the bay proper, though a number of Māori longboats put out from shore to come alongside Cook's ship Endeavour and sell fish to her crew. Less than two weeks later, Jean-François-Marie de Surville anchored his ship the Saint Jean Baptiste in the bay. In retaliation for the theft of a longboat which had gone adrift after his ship had dragged her anchor in a storm and narrowly escaped destruction, he carried off a Māori chief and set his village on fire. While at Doubtless Bay at Christmas 1769, de Surville's chaplain Father Paul-Antoine Léonard de Villefeix OP conducted the first Christian service in New Zealand.

Doubtless Bay became the first location in New Zealand where a whaling ship visited, when in 1792 the William and Ann visited the bay. Whaling stations operated on the shores of the bay in the 19th century.

The area was a centre of kauri gum extraction.

References

Citations

Far North District
Bays of the Northland Region
Whaling stations in New Zealand
Kauri gum